Pieter Fris (1627 – 1706) was a Dutch Golden Age landscape painter.

Biography
Fris was born in Amsterdam.  According to Houbraken he was a painter of moralistic and fantasy pieces who joined the Bentvueghels in Rome at the young age of 17 with the nickname Welgemoed (courage) for withstanding his acceptance ceremony without flinching. Since his ceremony entailed standing in a circle of firecrackers going off around him, a poem was written about his courage. Houbraken mentioned that Fris was embarrassed about the art profession, though he continued to practise it in Delft in later life. He was embarrassed because he felt that it wasn't as honest as other commercial pursuits.

The Fris Bentvueghel initiation ceremony story inspired Houbraken to close the second volume of his three volume Schouburg with a long poem of his own using all of the "Bent" nicknames he knew. He meant this poem as a tribute to all of the Bentvueghel painters through the ages, quoting his teacher Samuel van Hoogstraten and referring to the publication on ancient Roman ruins in 1709 by the Amsterdam publisher Johannes Crellius based on a set of drawings by Bonaventura van Overbeek (bentname Romulus), engraved by Matthys Pool including scenes of the Bentvueghels in action.

According to the RKD Fris was registered in 1645 in Rome, 1647 in Dordrecht, 1657 in Amsterdam, and became a member of the Haarlem Guild of Saint Luke from 1660-1668. He was living in Haarlem from 1666–1669, in Amsterdam in 1677, and in Delft in 1688 (he became a member of the Delft Guild of St. Luke in 1683).  He died in Delft.

References

1627 births
1706 deaths
Dutch Golden Age painters
Dutch male painters
Painters from Amsterdam
Painters from Haarlem
Painters from Delft
Members of the Bentvueghels